Digira is a settlement in Garissa County, Kenya.

References 

Populated places in North Eastern Province (Kenya)
Garissa County